Oliver James may refer to:

 Oliver James (psychologist) (born 1953), psychologist, journalist, author and television presenter
 Oliver James (actor) (born 1980), English musician, singer, songwriter and actor
 Oliver James (footballer) (born 1987), English professional footballer
 Oliver James (cricketer) (born 1990), Welsh cricketer
 Oliver James (rower) (born 1990), Paralympic rower
 Ollie Murray James (1871–1918), American politician

See also
 
 James Oliver (disambiguation)
 "Oliver James", a song by Fleet Foxes, from the 2008 album Fleet Foxes